The Lotus 42 is an open-wheel race car chassis, and was Team Lotus' second purpose-built IndyCar entry, designed to win 1967 Indianapolis 500, being driven by Graham Hill. The car was unsuccessful that year, with Hill retiring on lap 23 of the race. The car would end up finding most of its competition in Formula 5000 racing. It was powered by the naturally-aspirated,  Ford Indy V8 engine.

References

External links

38
American Championship racing cars
Formula 5000 cars